Aga Mir Syed Mohammad Baqir Mosavi or Aga Kirmani was a religious cleric who came from Kirman, Iran to Kashmir in order to spread the message of Islam. Perhaps he was one of the companions of Mir Syed Ali Hamdani. He came here in 1539 A.D. Another tradition is that he came with founder of Shiaism in Kashmir,
Mir Sham ud-Din Iraqi in 1500 A.D. He stayed at Wahabpora for a long period of time.

Martyrdom
He was killed by Mirza Muhammad Haidar Dughlat Kashgari with an axe near Sama-Taing at the age of 24 years  in 1549 A.D. When people heard about his martyrdom they tried to fight a battle against Mirza Muhammad Haidar Dughlat but they failed. This battle is known as Sama-Taing Battle. People beat their heads and chests in memory of the martyr. His funeral was taken to the Wahabpora and was buried there.
He was a great jurist, teacher and preacher. He was well experienced in art and handicraft.

Present scenario
The villagers of the adjacent villages come here every Thursday to offer dua for the deceased and pray. The shrine of Aga Mir Syed Mohammad Baqir Mosavi is surrounded with cemented wall and the colour of the shrine is dark green. A separate committee was established in 1990 A.D. to look after the whole building. This Astan Welfare Committee collects all funds of the building and is headed by a president.  Astan Bandar (marsiya khani) is organised every year in the month of August or September at the shrine.

Closure of shrine
Due to lockdown and spread of COVID-19 pandemic his shrine was completely closed for visitors and pilgrims. Astan Bandar was also postponed in the previous year. In November 2020, the shrine was reopened for the pilgrims.

External links
 Official page of Aga Syed Baqir Moosavi Shrine Wahabpora

References

16th-century Muslim theologians
Islamic religious leaders
1525 births
1549 deaths